Irreligion in Iran has a long historical background, non-religious citizens are officially unrecognized by the Iranian government. In official 2011 census, 265,899 persons did not state any religion (0.3% of total population). However, according to a 2020 online survey by Gamaan found a much larger percentage of Iranians identifying as atheist (8.8%), and a large fraction (22.2%) identifying as not following an organized religion.

Under Iranian law, apostasy from Shia faith is punishable by death. Non-religious Iranians are officially unrecognized by the government, and one must declare oneself as a member of one of the four recognized faiths in order to avail oneself of many of the rights of citizenship. Citizens of the Islamic Republic of Iran are officially divided into four categories: Muslims, Zoroastrians, Jews and Christians.  This official division ignores other religious minorities in Iran, notably the agnostics, atheists and Bahá'ís.

Within Iran
The oldest document referring to atheists in Iran, dates back to Zoroaster era where in Avesta, they are referred to as "Ashmoghs", which literally means heretics, apostates, or more precisely atheists. Regarding the post-Islamic Iran also there are historical contexts to opposing organised religion and not having faith in Islam throughout the centuries in Iran. In the 10th century AD, the famous Persian scientist Rhazes famously opposed religion and the divine revelation of prophets in his treatises Fī al-Nubuwwāt (On Prophecies) and Fī Ḥiyal al-Mutanabbīn (On the Tricks of False Prophets).

Further skepticism of the ideas of God could be seen in the quatrains of Omar Khayyam where the compassion of God and the ideas of afterlife are continuously questioned. This work was also written in the 10th century.

Under the Pahlavi dynasty from 1925 until the Iranian revolution of 1979, even though atheism was not officially accepted, it was tolerated. With the advent of communism in Russia (the northern neighbour of Iran) and the huge popularity of communist parties in Iran, such as the Tudeh Party especially in the late 1940s and 1960s, atheism grew in popularity. For example, Karo Derderian, the Armenian-Iranian poet and brother to the famous singer Viguen, famously wrote poetry rejecting both God and religion.

Although atheism was tolerated by the successive governments, socially the vast majority of people in Iran have been religious. When the revolution in Iran succeeded, given that the Islamic faction of revolutionaries succeeded in gaining total control over the political landscape of the country, irreligion became a political issue. Mehdi Bazargan noted "to  view Islam as an opposition to Iranian nationalism is tantamount to destroying ourselves. To deny Iranian identity and consider nationalism irreligious is part and parcel of the anti-Iranian movement and is the work of the anti-revolutionaries".

According to the Ali Reza Eshraghi, The problem with today’s Iranian society is that few political or religious critics are willing to recognise or understand the “popular religion.” In other words, both the Islamic regime and its opposing elites are not fond of the manners in which the laymen practice religion. Therefore, instead of relying on empirical observation they prefer to simply speculate about the religiosity of this very complex society. Measuring religiosity is not a simple task. The criteria are different among the social scientists. In 2012 only, Iranian scholars held thirteen sessions in Tehran to discuss the criteria.The limited research on this matter suggests that Iranian society is still a religious one. A study in 2009, conducted by two Iranian sociologists – Abbas Kazemi and Mehdi Faraji – conclude that in comparison to 1975, four years before the revolution, Iranians are still considerably very religious. The number of Iranians who pray or participate in socio-religious rituals has remained relatively unchanged. The number of people who fast has even increased.At the same time, as another sociologist Amir Nikpey says, Iranians have become modern and secular “without becoming anti-religion.”. Some Iranian feminists have also been noted as being irreligious and atheistic.

Irreligious Iranian youth aim to moderate Iranian government policy, and the Iranian youth are among the most politically active among the countries of the Islamic world. As the most restive segment of Iranian society, the young also represent one of the greatest long-term threats to the current form of theocratic rule. After the 2009 presidential election, youth was the biggest bloc involved in the region's first sustained “people power” movement for democratic change, creating a new political dynamic in the Middle East. Iran is one of the most tech-savvy societies in the developing world, with an estimated 28 million Internet users, led by youth. Most young Iranians are believed to want to be part of the international community and globalization.

Persecution
Iran was reported by The Washington Post to be among the thirteen countries where atheism can attract capital punishment. The last noted legal execution for apostasy in Iran was in 2014, when Mohsen Amir-Aslani was convicted and executed for making "innovations in religion" and insulting the Prophet Jonah. Furthermore, many people, such as Youcef Nadarkhani, Saeed Abedini have been recently harassed, jailed and sentenced to death for apostasy.

List of Non-Religious Iranians
 Armin Navabi Ex-Shia Muslim atheist and secular activist, author, podcaster and vlogger including founder of Atheist Republic
 Ashraf Dehghani Iranian female communist revolutionary, and is a member of the Iranian People's Fedai Guerrillas
 Aramesh Dustdar Philosopher, writer, scholar and a former philosophy lecturer at Tehran University
 Afshin Ellian Iranian-Dutch professor of law, philosopher, poet, and critic of political Islam. He is an expert in international public law and philosophy of law
 FM-2030 Belgian-born Iranian-American author, teacher, transhumanist philosopher, futurist, consultant and athlete
 Hadi Khorsandi Contemporary Iranian poet and satirist. Since 1979, he has been the editor and writer of the Persian-language satirical journal Asghar Agha 
 Shahin Najafi Iranian actor, musician, singer and songwriter 
 Maryam Namazie British-Iranian secularist and human rights activist, commentator, and broadcaster 
 Mina Ahadi Iranian-Austrian political activist
 Sadegh Hedayat Iranian writer, translator and intellectual, Best known for his novel The Blind Owl

Among Iranian diaspora

Iranian Americans
According to Harvard University professor Robert D. Putnam, the average Iranian-American is slightly less religious than the average American. In the book, Social Movements in 20th Century Iran: Culture, Ideology, and Mobilizing Frameworks, author Stephen C. Poulson adds that Western ideas are making Iranians irreligious.

Nearly as many Iranian Americans identify as irreligious as Muslim, and a full one-fifth are Christians, Jews, Baháʼís, or Zoroastrians. Additionally, the number of Muslim Iranian-Americans decreased from 42% in 2008 to 31% in 2012.

European Iranians
The Central Committee for Ex-Muslims was founded by Dutch-Iranian Ehsan Jami with an aim to support apostates and to bring attention to women's rights violations.

Organizations 
A British-Iranian organisation, “Iranian Atheists Association”, has been established in 2013 to form a platform for Iranian atheists to start debate and question the current Islamic republic’s attitude towards atheists, apostasy and human rights. A significant number of Iranians abroad, especially Iranian-Americans, are irreligious, agnostic or atheist.

See also

 Secularism in Iran
 Atheism
 Religion in Iran
 Zoroastrianism
 Islam in Iran
 Christianity in Iran
 Demographics of Iran
 Freedom of religion in Iran

References

External links
AtheistIran
Gamaan

Religion in Iran
Iran
Iran
Criticism of atheism